There were special elections to the United States House of Representatives in 1931 to the 71st United States Congress and 72nd United States Congress. After the 1930 House elections, the Republicans held a narrow majority of 218 seats, the smallest possible majority in congress. However, following these elections, the Democrats gained 3 seats resulting in a Democratic House majority. This Democratic majority was only further increased in the 1932 house elections and would survive for 63 years, with the Republicans only briefly holding the House following the 1946 and 1952 House elections. Republicans would only hold House control for a significant amount of time following the Republican Revolution of 1994.

71st Congress 

Elections are listed by date and district.

|-
| 

|}

72nd Congress 
Elections are listed by date and district.

|-
| 
| James B. Aswell
|  | Democratic
| 
|  | Incumbent died March 16, 1931.New member elected May 12, 1931.Democratic hold.
| nowrap | 

|-
| 
| Charles G. Edwards
|  | Democratic
| 
|  | Incumbent died July 13, 1931.New member elected September 9, 1931.Democratic hold.
| nowrap | 

|-
| 
| Samuel C. Major
|  | Democratic
| 
|  | Incumbent died July 28, 1931.New member elected September 29, 1931.Democratic hold.
| nowrap | 

|-
| 
| colspan=3 | Vacant
|  | Incumbent member-elect Henry A. Cooper (R) died March 1, 1931, in the previous congress.New member elected October 13, 1931.Republican gain.
| nowrap | 

|-
| 
| Bird J. Vincent
|  | Republican
| 
|  | Incumbent died July 18, 1931.New member elected November 3, 1931.Democratic gain.
| nowrap | 

|-
| 
| Matthew V. O'Malley
|  | Democratic
| 
|  | Incumbent died May 26, 1931.New member elected November 3, 1931.Democratic hold.
| nowrap | 

|-
| 
| Nicholas Longworth
|  | Republican
| 
|  | Incumbent died April 9, 1931.New member elected November 3, 1931.Republican hold.
| nowrap | 

|-
| 
| Charles A. Mooney
|  | Democratic
| 
|  | Incumbent died May 29, 1931.New member elected November 3, 1931.Democratic hold.
| nowrap | 

|-
| 
| George S. Graham
|  | Republican
| 
|  | Incumbent died July 4, 1931.New member elected November 3, 1931.Republican hold.
| nowrap | 

|-
| 
| Harry M. Wurzbach
|  | Republican
| 
|  | Incumbent died November 6, 1931.New member elected November 24, 1931.Democratic gain.
| nowrap | 

|-
| 
| Ernest R. Ackerman
|  | Republican
| 
|  | Incumbent died October 18, 1931.New member elected December 1, 1931.Democratic gain.
| nowrap | 

|}

References 

 
1931